John Wilson (born February 23, 1959) is an American professional golfer.

Wilson was born in Ceres, California. He turned professional in 1987.

Wilson played on the Nationwide Tour in 1992 and from  1998 to 2001, winning twice: the 1998 Nike Louisiana Open and the 1999 Nike Dayton Open. He played on the PGA Tour in  1991 and from 1994 to 1997. His best finish on this tour was T-4 at the 1994 Anheuser-Busch Golf Classic and the 1996 Phoenix Open.

Professional wins (3)

Nike Tour wins (2)

Nike Tour playoff record (0–2)

Other wins (1)
2003 California State Open

See also
1990 PGA Tour Qualifying School graduates
1993 PGA Tour Qualifying School graduates

References

External links

American male golfers
PGA Tour golfers
Golfers from California
People from Ceres, California
People from Indian Wells, California
1959 births
Living people